Zingel balcanicus, the Vardar streber is a species of freshwater ray-finned fish in the family Percidae, the perches, ruffes, pikeperches and the darters. This species is endemic to the Vardar or Axios River in North Macedonia and its distribution may extend to the lower reaches of the river in Greece. Its biology is little known but other species in the genus Zingel require turbulent flows.

Sources

balcanicus
Freshwater fish of Europe
Fish described in 1936
Taxa named by Stanko Karaman
Taxonomy articles created by Polbot